Jean-Marie-Louis Coupé (18 October 1732 – 10 May 1818) was a French abbé, man of letters and librarian.

Biography 
He studied in Paris and was ordained a priest and taught rhetorics at the College of Navarre. He then became tutor to the Prince of Vaudemont, son of the Countess de Brionne, with whom he traveled to Germany, Italy and Switzerland. He published several moral and literary works, including the periodical collections of mélanges and literary varieties. He was appointed a royal censor in 1778 and custodian of the titles and genealogies department of the Bibliothèque du roi in 1785. He became honorary censor after the Bourbon Restauration.

Publications 
1772: Manuel de morale, dédié à Monseigneur le comte d'Artois
1773: Dictionnaire des mœurs
1785–1787: Variétés littéraires, historiques, galantes, etc., 8 vol.
1779–1781: Histoire universelle des théâtres de toutes les nations, depuis Thespis jusqu'à nos jours, with Desfontaines-Lavallée, Testu et Le Fuel de Méricourt, 13 vol.
1795–1799: Les Soirées littéraires, ou Mélanges de traductions nouvelles des plus beaux morceaux de l'antiquité, de pièces instructives et amusantes, françaises et étrangères, 10 vol.
1801–1802: Spicilège de littérature ancienne ou moderne, ou Recueil d'ouvrages grecs et latins de tous les âges et de tous les genres ignorés ou peu connus, 2 vol.
Translations 
1778: Michel de L'Hospital : Essai de traduction de quelques épîtres et autres poésies latines de Michel de L'Hôpital, avec des éclaircissements sur sa vie et son caractère, 2 vol.
1795: Seneca the Younger : Théâtre de Sénèque. Traduction nouvelle, enrichie de notes historiques, littéraires et critiques, et suivie du texte latin corrigé d'après les meilleurs manuscrits, 2 vol. 
1796: Daniel Heinsius : Éloge de l'âne,
1796: Homer : Opuscules, 2 vol.
1796: Theognis of Megara : Sentences. Poème moral de Proclyde

Bibliography 
Pierre Larousse, Grand Dictionnaire universel du XIXe siècle, vol. V, 1869, p. 320
Jean-Philippe Gérard et Thierry Sarmant, « Les gardes du département des Titres et généalogies et les employés attachés au Cabinet des titres. 1720 à 1883 », Bibliothèque nationale de France, 2005.

External links 
 Jean-Marie-Louis Coupé on data.bnf.fr
 Coupé (abbé Jean-Marie-Louis) on Château de Versailles

18th-century French writers
18th-century French male writers
Latin–French translators
French librarians
1732 births
People from Somme (department)
1818 deaths
18th-century French translators